Chris Keating is an American football player.

Chris Keating may also refer to:
Chris Keating (musician), member of Yeasayer
Chris Keating, winner of Bundoora Football Club's League Best & Fairest in 1990 and 1992